Poshtang-e Gari (also Romanized as Poshtang-e Gārī; also known as Poshtang-e Gāreh) is a village in Ozgoleh Rural District, Ozgoleh District, Salas-e Babajani County, Kermanshah Province, Iran. At the 2006 census, its population was 161, in 34 families.

References 

Populated places in Salas-e Babajani County